Play Game: Holiday is the fourth extended play by South Korean girl group Weeekly. It was released on August 4, 2021 by Play M and distributed by Kakao. The physical version of the EP was made available in two versions: "E World" and "M World". It contains five tracks, including the lead single "Holiday Party".

Promotion 

They promoted the single "Holiday Party" at SBS's Inkigayo

Track listing 
Credits adapted from Melon.

Charts

Release history

References 

2021 EPs
Weeekly albums
Korean-language EPs